Ten thousand martyrs may refer to the ten thousand martyred Fathers of the deserts and caves of Scete by Theophilus of Alexandria or to the ten thousand martyrs of Mount Ararat who were, according to a medieval legend, Roman soldiers who, led by Saint Acacius, converted to Christianity and were crucified on Mount Ararat by order of the Roman emperor.  The story is attributed to the ninth century scholar Anastasius Bibliothecarius.

The Roman Martyrology contains two separate commemorations. The first is on March 18, corresponding to the very same date in the Greek Orthodox Synaxarion, where it is referred to as the "Myriads of Holy Martyrs, by the sword, at Nicomedia". Francis Mershman identifies these as those 20,000 Martyrs of Nicomedia killed during the Diocletian persecution. 

The second entry in the Roman Martyrology is for June 22 on Mount Ararat,; however, this appears to be based on a legend containing "many historical inaccuracies and utterly improbable details". The Greek Orthodox Synaxarion also has a second entry which is listed on June 1, for "The Holy Ten Thousand Martyrs" in Antiochia, under the Roman Emperor Decius. However, it is unclear if this refers to the same event as the Roman Martyrology entry for June 22.

Despite its questionable veracity, the event was extremely popular in Renaissance art, as seen for example in the painting 10,000 martyrs of Mount Ararat by the Venetian artist Vittore Carpaccio, or in the Martyrdom of the Ten Thousand by the German artist Albrecht Dürer.

Notes

References

External links
La Passione de Diecimila Martyri Crucifixi di Iesu Christo Dequali Scriue Sancto Girolamo... From the Rare Book and Special   Collections Division at the Library of Congress

People executed by crucifixion
People executed by the Roman Empire
4th-century Romans
4th-century Christian martyrs
4th-century executions
Groups of Roman Catholic saints
Groups of Christian martyrs of the Roman era
Legendary Romans
Mount Ararat